Trevor R. Reed is a United States Marine Corps veteran who was arrested in Russia in 2019 for deliberately committing violence against a Russian police officer. He was later sentenced to nine years in prison. Following his arrest, his family engaged in a public advocacy campaign in order to secure his release from Russia.  

In April 2022, Reed was released as a part of a prisoner exchange. The successful advocacy campaign of Reed's family, which pressured the U.S. government to secure his release from Russia, was a transformative moment for other families who are wrongfully detained. These families founded the Bring Our Families Home Campaign and followed the strategy of Reed's family.

Incident and arrest 
Following a party in May 2019, Reed became extremely drunk to the point that some friends and his girlfriend, Alina Tsybulnik, decided to leave so Reed could recover. After calling the police because they assumed a drunk tank would be safe, two officers took Reed and told Tsybulnik he could be retrieved shortly. Upon her arrival, however, she found Reed's face to be bruised and FSB officers there to interview him. Reed was charged under part 2 of article 318 of Russia's Criminal Code, which refers to violence committed against Russian officers. According to Russian authorities, while being driven to a police station, Reed grabbed for the officer driving causing the car to swerve about uncontrollably.

Sentencing 
On July 30, 2020, Reed was sentenced to serve nine years in a Russian prison, this in addition to time served since his arrest the previous year. Reactions to the news were quick and severe. Ambassador John J. Sullivan issued a statement on behalf of the US embassy, in which he said, "Today, U. S. citizen Trevor Reed was convicted in a Russian court following a trial in which the prosecution's case and the evidence presented against Mr. Reed were so preposterous that they provoked laughter in the courtroom. Even the judge laughed." He further guaranteed that "we will not rest until Trevor is freed and returns home to the United States."

Release 
On April 27, 2022, Reed was released back to the United States as part of a prisoner exchange for Konstantin Yaroshenko, a Russian pilot convicted of drug smuggling.

Criticism of charges 
Both Reed and his family have been intensely critical of the way in which the incident occurred and charges followed. Following his sentencing, Reed said, "I think anyone who has eyes and ears and who has been in this courtroom knows that I'm not guilty." Reed's father, Joey Reed, said, "I don't know at what level this was pushed. But somewhere someone in the government has pushed for Trevor to not leave Russia. It's obvious. There's no way that anyone, Russian or American, should ever have been convicted of this nothing."

According to testimony given by Tsybulnik, the officers' claim that the vehicle swerved as a result of Reed's assault was false, and she never saw the vehicle careen while following them to the police station. Additionally, despite there being security cameras in the police vehicle and police station, no footage of the alleged incident was made available to Reed's defense attorneys. Instead, Russian authorities claimed that the relevant footage had been erased.

References 

American people imprisoned in Russia
United States Marines